The Man from Earth: Holocene is an American science fiction drama film directed by Richard Schenkman and written by Richard Schenkman and Emerson Bixby, based on characters created by Bixby's father, science fiction writer Jerome Bixby. It is a sequel to the film The Man from Earth (2007). David Lee Smith returns as the "John Oldman" character, the protagonist from the original film, although going by a different name.  The marketing of the film was notable for leveraging a full spectrum of both conventional and "pirate" channels to maximize visibility and distribution.

Plot 
The plot focuses on university professor John Oldman, now calling himself John Young, who is secretly a Cro-Magnon man (or Magdalenian caveman) who has survived for more than 14,000 years. However, despite all those years of immortality, John has found that he has begun to age and no longer heals as quickly as he used to. Meanwhile, four of his students have begun to suspect the truth about him and contact Art Jenkins, whose career fell apart after publishing a book about John's story.

Cast 
 David Lee Smith as John Oldman/John Young
 William Katt as Dr. Art Jenkins
 Vanessa Williams as Carolyn
 Michael Dorn as Dr. Gil Parker
 Sterling Knight as Philip
 Brittany Curran as Tara
 Carlos Knight as Liko
 Akemi Look as Isabel
 John Billingsley as Harry

Production 
In 2013, Schenkman expressed the motivations behind the production of the film:
"People have been asking for this since the first movie became a viral phenomenon. Over the years, I've spent time developing this property with the ultimate goal of creating a long-form series. I've had a lot of help from a number of really talented people, and stunning support from fans all over the world. It's been a long road, but now that we're about to start shooting, I could not be more excited."

From 1 to 16 June 2016, principal photography for the film took place. Editing was completed on 21 September 2016. The producers have stated on Facebook that it could be the first in a series.

Release and P2P distribution 
On 16 January 2018, the creators themselves uploaded this film to The Pirate Bay for completely legal download.

Other partners have included MovieSaints.com (effective as of 19 January 2018), where fans were able pay to see the film but would receive a full refund if they did not enjoy it.

References

External links
 Official website
 

 

2017 films
American science fiction films
American sequel films
2010s science fiction films
2010s English-language films
2010s American films